Dayton Layne Hall (born September 19, 1998) is an American professional baseball pitcher for the Baltimore Orioles of Major League Baseball (MLB).

Amateur career
Hall attended Valdosta High School in Valdosta, Georgia as a freshman before transferring to Houston County High School in Warner Robins, Georgia. As a junior, he was 6–1 with a 1.81 earned run average (ERA) and 89 strikeouts. During summer 2016, he played in the Under Armour All-America Baseball Game at Wrigley Field and the Perfect Game All-American Game at Petco Park. Prior to his senior season, Hall transferred back to Valdosta. Hall committed to Florida State University to play college baseball.

Professional career
The Baltimore Orioles selected Hall in the first round, with the 21st overall selection, of the 2017 Major League Baseball draft. He signed with the Orioles and was assigned to the Gulf Coast League Orioles, giving up eight earned runs in  innings pitched. He spent 2018 with the Delmarva Shorebirds, going 2–7 with a 2.10 ERA and a 1.17 WHIP in 22 games (twenty starts).

Hall spent 2019 with the Frederick Keys, pitching to a 4–5 record with a 3.46 ERA over 19 games (17 starts), striking out 116 over  innings. He was named to the 2019 All-Star Futures Game. He did not play a game in 2020 due to the cancellation of the minor league season. In 2021, Hall pitched for the Bowie Baysox, but threw only  innings before his season was ended prematurely due to an elbow injury. Hall was selected to the 40-man roster following the season on November 19, 2021.

After starting the 2022 season on Baltimore's development list, the Orioles promoted Hall to the Norfolk Tides in May. The Orioles promoted him to the major leagues on August 13 to make his major league debut.

References

External links

1998 births
Living people
People from Warner Robins, Georgia
Baseball players from Georgia (U.S. state)
Major League Baseball pitchers
Baltimore Orioles players
Gulf Coast Orioles players
Delmarva Shorebirds players
Frederick Keys players
Bowie Baysox players
Norfolk Tides players
Aberdeen IronBirds players